The 2006–07 season was Torquay United F.C.'s 73rd and final season in the Football League before being relegated to the Conference National.  It covers the period from 1 July 2006 to 30 June 2007.

Review and events

Chronological order of events

 12 October: Chairman and owner Mike Bateson sells club to consortium led by Chris Roberts
 21 November: Roberts introduces an anti-diving initiative whereby Torquay players will be cautioned or fined for diving or feigning injury and if a third offence occurs will be transfer-listed or sacked
 27 November: Ian Atkins replaced as manager by former Czech international Luboš Kubík
 10 January: Former manager Colin Lee brought in to assist Kubik 
 5 February: Manager Luboš Kubík resigns
 5 February: Midfielder Matthew Hewlett forced to retire due to a back injury
 6 February: Midfielder Darren Baxter and defender Nathan Simpson are released
 7 February: Colin Lee appointed as Director of Football
 8 February: Keith Curle appointed as Head Coach until the end of the season
 16 February: Sheffield United midfielder Lloyd Kerry joins on a month's loan
 21 February: Chris Roberts resigns as chairman after a protest by three long-serving directors who resigned over Roberts' handling of the club
 23 February: Local hotel owner Keith Richardson is appointed as the club's new chairman
 26 February: Loanees Kevin Miller, Rossi Jarvis and Matthew Halliday return to their parent clubs
 27 February: Chairman Keith Richardson distances himself and the club from plans to build a new stadium
 2 March: Lincoln City goalkeeper Simon Rayner and Sheffield United striker Dean Oliver join on one-month loan deals and Sheffield United defender Chris Robertson joins on non-contract terms
 6 March: Winger Marvin Williams joins on loan from Millwall until the end of the season
 7 March: Mike Bateson returns as chairman
 20 March: Defender John Wheeldon told he will be released at the end of the season
 21 March: Former Torquay striker David Graham rejoins the club on loan from Sheffield Wednesday until the end of the season
 22 March: Plymouth Argyle striker Reuben Reid joins on loan until the end of the season
 2 April: Loanees Alistair John, Dean Oliver and Simon Rayner extend their loan stays until the end of the season
 12 April: Loanees Alistair John and Lloyd Kerry return to Charlton Athletic and Sheffield United respectively after suffering injuries
 14 April: Torquay's relegation from the football league is confirmed after a 1–1 draw at home to Peterborough United. Bateson puts the club up for sale after the game
 5 May: Torquay play their final game in the Football League, a goalless draw at home to Hereford United
 14 May: Chairman Mike Bateson stands down as chairman and is replaced by Mervyn Benney, although Bateson remains as majority shareholder
 14 May: Director of Football Colin Lee is made redundant
 17 May: Former manager Leroy Rosenior takes over as manager from Keith Curle, but is effectively out of a job again ten minutes later when Bateson informs him that the club has been sold
 24 May: Alex Rowe appointed chairman after new consortium buys club from Mike Bateson
 25 May: Colin Lee appointed as club's new Chief Executive
 2 June: Former Torquay midfielder Paul Buckle is appointed as the club's new manager
 4 June: Canadian goalkeeper Simon Rayner is signed on a free transfer from Lincoln City having been on loan to Torquay the previous season
 6 June: Goalkeeper Martin Rice is signed on a free transfer from Exeter City
 13 June: Shaun North appointed to Torquay coaching staff
 13 June: Midfielder Matthew Hockley agrees new one-year contract
 20 June: Chris Robertson and Chris Hargreaves sign for Torquay on free transfers from Sheffield United and Oxford United respectively
 21 June: Defender Kevin Nicholson joins Torquay after rejecting a new contract at Forest Green Rovers
 22 June: Striker Lee Phillips is signed on a three contract from Exeter City, for a fee of £17,500
 28 June: Striker Tim Sills joins from Hereford United on a two-year contract 
 28 June: Striker Lee Thorpe has his contract terminated by mutual consent and joins Brentford five days later

Player statistics

References

Torquay United F.C. seasons
Torquay United